Monmouth Municipal Airport is a civil, public use airport located two miles north of Monmouth, Illinois. The airport is publicly owned by the City of Monmouth.

History
The airport was founded in 1921 by a group known as the Aero Club. The Club raised money both from the community and the Curtiss-Iowa Aircraft Corporation. It is the oldest continuously operating airport in Illinois.

In 2019, a fire destroyed the airport's main hangar, destroying not only the hangar but also administrative building, airport documents, and eight of the ten aircraft stored there.The airport's plans for a new hangar was approved in 2021. The new hangar was completed in 2022 and opened for use in July of that year.

Facilities
The airport has one runway: runway 3/21 is 2899 x 60 ft (884 x 18 m) and made of asphalt.

The airport operates its own FBO, offering fuel; parking and hangars; and a courtesy car. Local pilots can take advantage of flight training and aircraft rental. Aerial photography services are also available.

Aircraft
In the 12-month period ending August 31, 2019, the airport had 96 airport operations per week, or about 5000 per year. These are 96% general aviation and 4% air taxi. For the same time period, the airport had 9 based aircraft, all of which are single-engine.

References

Airports in Illinois